Luboszyce may refer to the following places in Poland:
Luboszyce, Lower Silesian Voivodeship (south-west Poland)
Luboszyce, Lubusz Voivodeship (west Poland)
Luboszyce, Opole Voivodeship (south-west Poland)